William Baker (born 1973 in Manchester, England) is a fashion designer, fashion journalist, stylist, author and theatre director, best known for his past work with musician Kylie Minogue.

Baker attended the Manchester Grammar School, from where he went on to study Theology at King’s College London. He was the inspiration for Manchester indie band The Man From Delmonte's song "Pink". While studying he worked as a sales assistant for Vivienne Westwood where he met the singer Kylie Minogue and her photographer Katerina Jebb.

Other work
In 2007, he made his debut as a theatre director with a West End revival of Rent dubbed Rent Remixed which received mixed reviews. When asked beforehand how he was going to handle the change in direction, he claimed he said; "I'm approaching it in the same way I would approach a Kylie show or tour".

He has also worked with the musical acts Garbage, Tricky, Björk, Tori Amos, Reef and Jamiroquai on album and single covers, and music videos.

He collaborated with Jay Kay of Jamiroquai on the costume and set design for both the A Funk Odyssey album cover and tour.

Baker worked as stylist for Britney Spears on her 2009 The Circus Starring Britney Spears tour.

He has also been credited as director of British pop singer Leona Lewis' critically acclaimed debut tour The Labyrinth, which was filmed in the London O2 Arena for a DVD/CD release.

References

1973 births
Living people
People educated at Manchester Grammar School
Alumni of King's College London
English fashion designers
English theatre directors
English LGBT artists
LGBT fashion designers
Designers from Greater Manchester
Fashion stylists